Baghuk may refer to:
 Baghuk, Kerman
 Baghuk, Sistan and Baluchestan